Jafarabad (also Romanized as Ja‘farābād) is a village in Khvoresh Rostam-e Jonubi Rural District, Khvoresh Rostam District, Khalkhal County, Ardabil Province, Iran. At the 2006 census, its population was 231, in 52 families.

References 

Towns and villages in Khalkhal County